Anthony Joseph Muser (born August 1, 1947) is currently a roving instructor in the San Diego Padres organization. He is a former Major League Baseball player, and later served in several coaching positions. From 1997 until 2002, Muser served as the manager of the Kansas City Royals.  After being replaced by John Mizerock, Muser spent four seasons as the bench coach for the San Diego Padres under Bruce Bochy.

Playing career
Signed as an amateur free agent by the Boston Red Sox in 1967, Muser spent parts of nine seasons in the majors between 1969 and 1978. After debuting with the Red Sox, he also played for the Chicago White Sox, Baltimore Orioles, and Milwaukee Brewers. In , he was the White Sox starting first baseman, setting career highs with 4 home runs and 30 runs batted in while batting .285 in 109 games. 
After batting .260 during the first  months of the campaign, Muser was acquired by the Orioles from the White Sox for Jesse Jefferson in one of two transactions made by Chicago at the non-waiver trade deadline on June 15, . Following his major league career, he played in Japan for the Seibu Lions in 1979.

During his career, Muser played mostly first base, but did not hit for much in the way of average or power at a position that is historically more known for offense than defense.  He had a lifetime .259 batting average and only seven home runs in his entire career.

Post-playing career

Coach and minor league manager
In , Muser was brought back into the Brewers organization, as he was hired as manager of the Stockton Ports, one of Milwaukee's A-ball farm clubs. The Ports won the league championship in 1980, and Muser was moved up to the Double-A El Paso Diablos. After two-plus seasons in El Paso, during which Muser's teams went 176–162, Muser was promoted again, this time to the Triple-A Vancouver Canadians, where he replaced Dick Phillips in midseason. After a season and a half there, Muser was moved up to the Brewers' coaching staff, where he served as third base coach from  through spring training in  when he was severely injured in a gas explosion in the Compadre Stadium clubhouse and missed the rest of the 1986 season. Muser was in line to succeed George Bamberger as manager but because of his injuries was replaced as third base coach by Tom Trebelhorn who went on to manage the Brewers for five years. Muser returned as hitting coach from  until .

In , Muser moved to the Chicago Cubs, where he served as their hitting coach until , when he was named manager of the Kansas City Royals.

Royals manager
On July 9, 1997, Muser replaced Bob Boone as manager of the Kansas City Royals. The Royals were 36–46 at the time, but finished the season even worse, going 31–48 under Muser, finishing 4th in the American League Central. After starting the  season 8–15, Muser was fired as manager and replaced by John Mizerock.

Back to coaching
He served as the Padres' bench coach until , then returned to the minor leagues as a manager. In , Muser was the manager for the Peoria Padres, the Padres' rookie level team in the Arizona League. In 2008, he became a roving minor league instructor for the Padres.

Managerial records

References

External links

Pura Pelota

1947 births
Living people
American expatriate baseball players in Japan
Baltimore Orioles players
Baseball players from California
Boston Red Sox players
Chicago Cubs coaches
Chicago White Sox players
Florida Instructional League Red Sox players
Greenville Red Sox players
Indianapolis Indians players
Kansas City Royals managers
Louisville Colonels (minor league) players
Major League Baseball bench coaches
Major League Baseball hitting coaches
Major League Baseball third base coaches
Milwaukee Brewers coaches
Milwaukee Brewers players
Minor league baseball managers
People from Van Nuys, Los Angeles
San Diego Mesa College alumni
San Diego Padres coaches
Seibu Lions players
Tigres de Aragua players
American expatriate baseball players in Venezuela
Tucson Toros players
Waterloo Hawks (baseball) players
Winston-Salem Red Sox players